The California Poet Laureate is the poet laureate for the state of California.   In 2001, Governor Gray Davis created the official position.  Each poet laureate for the State of California is appointed by the Governor of California for a term of two years and must be confirmed by the senate.  Previous to Governor Davis' action in creating the position, the title was unofficial and the position was held for life.  The program is run by the California Arts Council.

Poets laureate

Ina Donna Coolbrith, appointed on June 30, 1915. Held the title until her death in 1928.
Henry Meade Bland, 1929–1931
John Steven McGroarty, 1933–1944
Gordon W. Norris, 1953–1961
Charles B. Garrigus, 1966–2000
Quincy Troupe, June 11, 2002 – October 2002.
Al Young, May 12, 2005 – 2008
Carol Muske-Dukes, November 14, 2008 – 2011
Juan Felipe Herrera, March 21, 2012 – 2014
Dana Gioia, December 4, 2015 – 2018
Lee Herrick, November 18, 2022 – Present

See also

 Poets laureate of U.S. states
 List of poetry awards
 List of American literary awards
 List of municipal poets laureate in California
 United States Poet Laureate

References

External links
 California Poet Laureate website
 California Poets Laureate at Library of Congress

Lists of poets
California culture
American poetry awards
 
American Poets Laureate